List of Ottoman people is an incomplete list which refers to people who lived in the Ottoman Empire (1299-1922). Naturally, some people who lived in the Empire during its last years, also lived in the early years of the Republic of Turkey, or other countries previously ruled by the Ottoman state.

Sultans

 Osman I
 Orhan
 Murad I
 Bayezid I
 Mehmed I
 Murad II
 Mehmed II
 Bayezid II
 Selim I
 Suleiman I
 Selim II
 Murad III
 Mehmed III
 Ahmed I
 Mustafa I
 Osman II
 Murad IV
 Ibrahim
 Mehmed IV
 Suleiman II
 Ahmed II
 Mustafa II
 Ahmed III
 Mahmud I
 Osman III
 Mustafa III
 Abdul Hamid I
 Selim III
 Mustafa IV
 Mahmud II
 Abdulmejid I
 Abdulaziz
 Murad V
 Abdul Hamid II
 Mehmed V
 Mehmed VI
 Abdulmejid II

Mothers of the sultans and other women who assumed the title "Valide Sultan"

 Halime Hatun
 Malhun Hatun
 Nilüfer Hatun
 Gülçiçek Hatun
 Devlet Hatun
 Emine Hatun
 Hüma Hatun
 Gülbahar Hatun
 Gülbahar Hatun
 Hafsa Sultan
 Hürrem Sultan
 Nurbanu Sultan
 Safiye Sultan
 Handan Sultan
 Halime Sultan
 Mahfiruz Hatun
 Kösem Sultan
 Turhan Sultan
 Saliha Dilaşub Sultan
 Muazzez Sultan
 Rabia Emetullah Gülnuş Sultan
 Saliha Sultan
 Şehsuvar Sultan
 Mihrişah Kadın
 Rabia Şermi Kadın
 Mihrişah Sultan
 Sineperver Sultan
 Nakşidil Sultan
 Bezmiâlem Sultan
 Pertevniyal Sultan
 Şevkefza Sultan
 Tirimüjgan Kadın
 Rahime Perestu Sultan
 Gülcemal Kadın
 Gülistu Kadın

Male members of the dynasty (other than the sultans)

 Ertuğrul
 Alaeddin Pasha
 Süleyman Pasha
 Şehzade Halil
 Savcı Bey
 Süleyman Çelebi
 İsa Çelebi
 Musa Çelebi
 Mustafa Çelebi
 Küçük Mustafa
 Cem Sultan
 Şehzade Ahmet
 Şehzade Korkut
 Şehzade Mustafa
 Şehzade Mehmed
 Şehzade Bayezid
 Sultan Yahya
 Şehzade Mahmud
 Şehzade Yusuf Izzeddin
 Şehzade Selim Süleyman
 Abdulmejid II
 Şehzade Mehmed Şevket
 Şehzade Mehmed Seyfeddin
 Şehzade Mehmed Selim
 Şehzade Mehmed Selaheddin
 Şehzade Mehmed Abdülkadir
 Şehzade Mehmed Burhaneddin
 Şehzade Mehmed Abid
 Şehzade Abdurrahim Hayri
 Şehzade Mehmed Ziyaeddin
 Şehzade Ömer Faruk
 Şehzade Ömer Hilmi
 Ahmed IV Nihad
 Osman IV Fuad
 Mehmed Abdulaziz II
 Ali Vâsib
 Mehmed VII Orhan
 Ertuğrul Osman V

Female members of the dynasty (Other than the mothers and the valide sultans)

 Asporça Hatun
 Theodora Hatun
 Despina Hatun
 Maria Thamara Hatun
 Hafsa Hatun
 Hatice Halime Hatun
 Meryem Hatun
 Gülşah Hatun
 Sittişah Hatun
 Çiçek Hatun
 Nigar Hatun
 Şirin Hatun
 Gülruh Hatun
 Bülbül Hatun
 Hüsnüşah Hatun
 Muhtereme Hatun
 Mahidevran Sultan
 Şemsiruhsar Hatun
 Ayşe Sultan
 Akile Hatun (wife of Osman II)
 Ayşe Sultan
 Hümaşah Sultan (wife of Ibrahim)

Princesses

 Adile Sultan 
 Aliye Sultan
 Aynışah Hatun
 Ayşe Hatun (daughter of Bayezid II) 
 Ayşe Sultan
 Ayşe Sultan (daughter of Ahmed I) 
 Ayşe Sultan (daughter of Murad III) 
 Ayşe Hümaşah Sultan
 Behice Sultan
 Beyhan Sultan (daughter of Mustafa III)
 Beyhan Sultan (daughter of Selim I) 
 Cemile Sultan
 Dürriye Sultan
 Esma Sultan (daughter of Abdülaziz)
 Esma Sultan (daughter of Abdul Hamid I)
 Esma Sultan (daughter of Ahmed III)
 Emine Sultan (daughter of Abdülaziz)
 Emine Sultan (daughter of Mustafa II)
 Fatma Sultan (daughter of Abdulmejid I)
 Fatma Sultan (daughter of Ahmed I) 
 Fatma Sultan (daughter of Ahmed III) 
 Fatma Sultan (daughter of Murad V)
 Fatma Sultan (daughter of Selim I) 
 Fatma Sultan (daughter of Selim II)
 Fehime Sultan
 Gevherhan Hatun 
 Gevherhan Sultan (daughter of Ahmed I) 
 Gevherhan Sultan (daughter of Selim II)
 Hanzade Sultan (daughter of Ahmed I)
 Hanzade Sultan (daughter of Şehzade Ömer Faruk)
 Hatice Sultan (daughter of Ahmed III)
 Hatice Sultan (daughter of Selim I) 
 Hatice Sultan (daughter of Mehmed IV)
 Hatice Sultan (daughter of Murad V)
 Hatice Sultan (daughter of Mustafa III) 
 Hümaşah Sultan (daughter of Şehzade Mehmed)
 Ismihan Sultan
 Kaya Sultan
 Lütfiye Sultan
 Mediha Sultan 
 Mihrimah Sultan (daughter of Suleiman I)
 Mihrimah Sultan (daughter of Mahmud II)
 Mihrimah Sultan (daughter of Şehzade Ziyaeddin)
 Mihrişah Sultan (daughter of Şehzade Izzeddin)
 Mukbile Sultan
 Münire Sultan 
 Münire Sultan (daughter of Şehzade Kemaleddin)
 Naile Sultan (daughter of Abdulmejid I) 
 Naile Sultan (daughter of Abdul Hamid II)
 Naime Sultan
 Nefise Hatun 
 Necla Sultan
 Nemika Sultan
 Neslişah Sultan (daughter of Şehzade Ömer Faruk) 
 Neslişah Sultan (daughter of Şehzade Abdülkadir)
 Raziye Sultan 
 Refia Sultan
 Refia Sultan
 Rukiye Sultan
 Sabiha Sultan 
 Şadiye Sultan
 Saliha Sultan (daughter of Ahmed III)
 Saliha Sultan (daughter of Mahmud II)
 Saliha Sultan (daughter of Abdülaziz)
 Seniha Sultan 
 Şah Sultan (daughter of Selim I) 
 Şah Sultan (daughter of Selim II) 
 Şah Sultan (daughter of Mustafa III)
 Selçuk Hatun
 Ulviye Sultan
 Ümmi Sultan
 Ümmü Gülsüm Sultan (daughter of Mehmed IV)
 Ümmügülsüm Sultan (daughter of Ahmed III)
 Zekiye Sultan

Crimean Khans

 Meñli I Giray
 Mehmed I Giray
 Sahib I Giray
 Devlet I Giray
 Mehmed IV Giray
 Islam III Giray
 Adil Giray
 Selim I Giray
 Devlet II Giray
 Şahin Giray

Grand viziers

 Alaeddin Pasha
 Nizamüddin Ahmet Pasha 
 Hacı Pasha 
 Sinanüddin Fakih Yusuf Pasha
 Çandarlı Kara Halil Hayreddin Pasha 
 Çandarlı Ali Pasha
 Imamzade Halil Pasha 
 Beyazıt Pasha 
 Çandarlı Ibrahim Pasha 
 Koca Mehmet Nizamüddin Pasha
 Çandarlı Halil Pasha
 Zagan Pasha
 Mahmut Pasha 
 Rum Mehmet Pasha 
 Ishak Pasha 
 Gedik Ahmed Pasha 
 Karamani Mehmed Pasha 
 Koca Davud Pasha 
 Hersekzade Ahmed Pasha 
 Çandarlı Ibrahim Pasha (2nd) 
 Mesih Pasha 
 Hadim Ali Pasha 
 Koca Mustafa Pasha 
 Dukakinzade Ahmed Pasha 
 Hadim Sinan Pasha 
 Yunus Pasha 
 Piri Mehmed Pasha 
 Pargalı Ibrahim Pasha 
 Ayas Mehmed Pasha 
 Lûtfi Pasha 
 Hadim Suleiman Pasha 
 Rüstem Pasha 
 Kara Ahmed Pasha 
 Semiz Ali Pasha 
 Sokollu Mehmet Pasha 
 Şemsi Pasha 
 Lala Kara Mustafa Pasha 
 Koca Sinan Pasha 
 Kanijeli Siyavuş Pasha 
 Özdemiroğlu Osman Pasha 
 Hadim Mesih Pasha 
 Ferhat Pasha 
 Lala Mehmet Pasha 
 Damad Ibrahim Pasha 
 Cigalazade Yusuf Sinan Pasha 
 Hadim Hasan Pasha 
 Cerrah Mehmed Pasha 
 Yemişçi Hasan Pasha 
 Yavuz Ali Pasha 
 Sokolluzade Mehmet Pasha 
 Dervish Mehmed Pasha 
 Kuyucu Murat Pasha
 Nasuh Pasha 
 Kara Mehmed Pasha 
 Damat Halil Pasha 
 Güzelce Ali Pasha 
 Ohrili Hüseyin Pasha 
 Dilaver Pasha 
 Kara Davud Pasha 
 Mere Hüseyin Pasha 
 Lefkeli Mustafa Pasha 
 Gürcü Hadim Mehmed Pasha 
 Mere Hüseyin Pasha 
 Kemankeş Kara Ali Pasha 
 Çerkez Mehmet Pasha 
 Hafız Ahmet Pasha 
 Damat Halil Pasha 
 Gazi Hüsrev Pasha 
 Hafiz Ahmed Pasha 
 Topal Recep Pasha 
 Tabanıyassı Mehmet Pasha 
 Bayram Pasha 
 Tayyar Mehmet Pasha
 Kemankeş Mustafa Pasha 
 Sultanzade Mehmet Pasha
 Nevesinli Salih Pasha 
 Kara Musa Pasha
 Hezarpare Ahmet Pasha
 Sofu Mehmet Pasha 
 Kara Murat Pasha 
 Melek Ahmet Pasha 
 Abaza Siyavuş Pasha I 
 Gürcü Mehmet Pasha
 Tarhoncu Ahmet Pasha 
 Derviş Mehmet Pasha 
 Ipşiri Mustafa Pasha 
 Ermeni Süleyman Pasha 
 Gazi Hüseyin Pasha 
 Zurnazen Mustafa Pasha 
 Abaza Siyavuş Pasha 
 Boynuyaralı Mehmet Pasha 
 Köprülü Mehmet Pasha 
 Köprülü Fazıl Ahmet Pasha 
 Merzifonlu Kara Mustafa Pasha 
 Bayburtlu Kara Ibrahim Pasha 
 Sarı Süleyman Pasha 
 Ayaşlı İsmail Pasha 
 Bekri Mustafa Pasha 
 Köprülü Fazıl Mustafa Pasha 
 Arabacı Ali Pasha 
 Çalık Ali Pasha 
 Bozoklu Mustafa Pasha 
 Sürmeli Ali Pasha 
 Elmas Mehmet Pasha 
 Köprülü Hüseyin Pasha
 Daltaban Mustafa Pasha 
 Rami Mehmet Pasha 
 Nişancı Ahmet Pasha
 Moralı Hasan Pasha
 Kalaylıkoz Ahmet Pasha 
 Baltaci Mehmet Pasha 
 Çorlulu Ali Pasha 
 Köprülü Numan Pasha 
 Gürcü Ağa Yusuf Pasha 
 Silahdar Süleyman Pasha 
 Kel Hoca Ibrahim Pasha 
 Silahdar Damat Ali Pasha 
 Hacı Halil Pasha 
 Tevkii Mehmet Pasha 
 Nevşehirli Damat Ibrahim Pasha 
 Silahtar Mehmet Pasha
 Kabakulak Ibrahim Pasha 
 Topal Osman Pasha
 Hekimoğlu Ali Pasha 
 Gürcü Ismail Pasha 
 Silahdar Seyyid Mehmed Pasha 
 Muhsinzade Abdullah Pasha 
 Yeğen Mehmet Pasha 
 Ivaz Mehmed Pasha
 Nişancı Ahmet Pasha 
 Seyyid Hasan Pasha 
 Tirtaki Mehmet Pasha 
 Seyyit Abdullah Pasha 
 Divitdar Mehmed Emin Pasha 
 Köse Bahir Mustafa Pasha 
 Naili Abdullah Pasha 
 Silahdar Bıyıklı Ali Pasha 
 Yirmisekizzade Mehmed Sait Pasha
 Koca Ragıp Pasha 
 Tevkii Hamza Hamid Pasha
 Muhsinzade Mehmet Pasha 
 Hamza Mahir Pasha 
 Hacı Mehmet Pasha 
 Moldovancı Ali Pasha 
 Ivazzade Halil Pasha
 Silahdar Mehmet Pasha
 Safranbolulu İzzet Mehmet Pasha 
 Moralı Derviş Mehmed Pasha 
 Darendeli Cebecizade Mehmed Pasha
 Kalafat Mehmed Pasha 
 Seyyit Mehmet Pasha 
 İzzet Mehmet Pasha 
 Yeğen Hacı Mehmed Pasha 
 Halil Hamid Pasha 
 Hazinedar Şahin Ali Pasha 
 Koca Yusuf Pasha 
 Meyyit Hasan Pasha 
 Cezayirli Gazi Hasan Pasha 
 Çelebizade Şerif Hasan Pasha 
 Damad Melek Mehmed Pasha 
 Safranbolulu İzzet Mehmet Pasha 
 Kör Yusuf Ziyaüddin Pasha 
 Hafiz Ismail Pasha 
 Ibrahim Hilmi Pasha 
 Çelebi Mustafa Pasha 
 Alemdar Mustafa Pasha 
 Çavuşbaşı Memiş Pasha 
 Laz Aziz Ahmed Pasha 
 Hurşit Pasha 
 Mehmed Emin Rauf Pasha 
 Dervish Mehmet Pasha 
 Seyyid Ali Pasha 
 Benderli Ali Pasha 
 Hacı Salih Pasha 
 Deli Abdullah Pasha 
 Turnacıbaşı Silahdar Ali Pasha 
 Mehmet Sait Galip Pasha 
 Mehmet Selim Pasha 
 Darendeli Mehmet Pasha  
 Reşid Mehmet Pasha  
 Koca Hüsrev Mehmed Pasha 
 Mustafa Reşit Pasha 
 Ibrahim Sarim Pasha  
 Mehmed Emin Âli Pasha 
 Damad Mehmed Ali Pasha 
 Mustafa Naili Pasha  
 Kıbrıslı Mehmet Emin Pasha  
 Mehmet Rüştü Pasha  
 Mehmet Fuat Pasha  
 Yusuf Kamil Pasha  
 Mahmut Nedim Pasha  
 Midhat Pasha  
 Ahmed Esad Pasha  
 Şirvanlı Mehmet Rüştü Pasha  
 Hüseyin Avni Pasha  
 Ahmed Esad Pasha  
 Ibrahim Edhem Pasha  
 Ahmet Hamdi Pasha  
 Ahmet Vefik Pasha  
 Mehmet Sadık Pasha  
 Saffet Pasha  
 Hayreddin Pasha  
 Ahmet Arifi Pasha  
 Mehmet Sait Pasha  
 Kadri Pasha  
 Abdurrahman Nureddin Pasha  
 Kâmil Pasha  
 Ahmet Cevat Şakir Pasha 
 Halil Rifat Pasha  
 Mehmet Ferit Pasha 
 Hüseyin Hilmi Pasha  
 Ahmet Tevfik Pasha 
 Ibrahim Hakki Pasha  
 Gazi Ahmet Muhtar Pasha 
 Mahmut Şevket Pasha 
 Said Halim Pasha  
 Mehmet Talat Pasha  
 Ahmet Izzet Pasha  
 Damad Ferid Pasha  
 Ali Riza Pasha  
 Salih Hulusi Pasha

Other notable politicians, commanders and the seamen

 Turgut Alp 
 Gazi Evrenos
 Hacı İlbey
 Lala Şahin Pasha
 Tiryaki Hasan Pasha
 Telli Hasan Pasha
 Özdemir Pasha
 Cezzar Ahmet Pasha
 Ali Pasha
 Muhammed Ali of Egypt
 Gazi Osman Pasha
 Ethem Pasha
 Ahmet Cemal
 Enver Pasha
 Kemal Reis
 Piri Reis
 Oruç Reis
 Barbaros Hayrettin Pasha
 Aydın Reis
 Turgut Reis
 Kurtoğlu Muslihiddin Reis
 Salih Reis
 Murat Reis the Elder
 Seydi Ali Reis
 Piyale Pasha
 Kurtoğlu Hızır Reis
 Müezzinzade Ali Pasha
 Kılıç Ali Pasha
 Mezzo Morto Hüseyin Pasha
 Ulubatlı Hasan
 Yeğen Osman Pasha

Men of letters, Scientists, Architects, Poets, Musicians and Painters

 Aşıkpaşazade
 İdris-i Bitlisi
 Matrakçı Nasuh
 Hoca Sadeddin Efendi
 Mustafa Âlî
 Mustafa Selaniki
 Koçi Bey
 Katip Çelebi
 Evliya Çelebi
 İbrahim Peçevi
 Mustafa Naima
 Ibrāhīm al-Ḥalabī
 Osman Aga of Timişoara
 Hasan (Janissary secretary)
 İbrahim Müteferrika
 Silahdar Findiklili Mehmed Aga
 Yirmisekiz Mehmed Çelebi
 Ahmed Resmî Efendi
 Ahmet Cevdet Pasha
 Ziya Gökalp
 Şerafeddin Sabuncuoğlu
 Ali Kuşçu
 Mirim Çelebi
 Orban
 Takiyuddin
 Hezârfen Ahmet Çelebi
 Lagari Hasan Çelebi
 Erzurumlu İbrahim Hakkı
 Munejjim-bashi Ahmed Dede
 Ak Şemsettin
 Atik Sinan
 Mimar Sinan
 Sedefkar Mehmed Agha
 Mimar Kasım
 Ahmed Karahisari
 Nakkaş Osman
 Hâfiz Osman
 Levni
 Osman Hamdi Bey
 Şahkulu 
 Şeker Ahmet Paşa
 Hoca Ali Riza
 Zafer Hanım
 Fitnat Hanım
 Hafız Post
 Buhurizade Itri
 Hampartsoum Limondjian
 Dede Efendi
 Tanburi Büyük Osman Bey
 Hacı Arif Bey
 Tatyos Efendi
 Tamburi Cemil Bey
 Güllü Agop
 Vartan Pasha
 Sheikh Hamdullah
 Ahmet Midhat
 Fatma Aliye
 Veli Can
 Yazıcıoğlu Ali
 Yahya Efendi
 Feridun Ahmed Bey

Rebels

 Sheikh Bedrettin
 Torlak Kemal
 Börklüce Mustafa
 Şahkulu 
 Celal                      
 Baba Zinnun
 Kalender Çelebi
 Karayazıcı
 Abaza Mehmed Pasha
 Abaza Hasan Pasha
 Patrona Halil
 Kabakçı Mustafa
 Tepedelenli Ali Pasha
 Kavalalı Mehmed Ali Pasha 
 Atçalı Kel Mehmet

See also
 List of Turkish people
 Outline of the Ottoman Empire

People